Lukino Selo is a village located in the Zrenjanin municipality, in the Central Banat District of Serbia. It is situated in the Autonomous Province of Vojvodina. The village has a Hungarian ethnic majority (67.56%) and its population numbering 498 people (2011 census).

Location 

On the northeast and east, the village borders almost connected villages of Ečka and Stajićevo. Belo Blato is to the southwest.

Geography 

Geographically, the entire region is actually an alluvial plain of the Tisza river, which flows west of the village. Village is located on the northeast shore of the Belo jezero, the ending section of the large Ečka fish pond.

As the elongated atar (village area), is much larger than the settlement itself, it comprises the entire fish pond and reaches the Tisza river of the west. Apart from the Belo, the pond consists of Kopova lakes, several connected lakes (Koča, Mika, Joca), which are part of the old riverbed of the Tisza. There are two smaller bodies of water in the village area, outside of the fish pond complex, Šuvajka and Novo lakes, to the north. The protected wetland of Carska Bara is south of the village. The special nature reserve is the largest individual bog in Serbia.

History 

The village was founded in 1785 when the Hungarian settlers from the neighboring villages, like Ečka, began moving in the area. They were noted as the good tobacco farmers. As it was built on the land of the nobleman, count Lazar Lukač, it was named Lukácsfalva after his surname. Lukač, a count from Transylvania but of Armenian origin, encouraged the settling in the marshland which surrounded the lakes and rivers, as he needed workforce for his estate, especially for the vegetable production, as he was also selling the products. Lukač purchased vast land, tens of thousands of hectares from the Imperial Court in Vienna. He built Kaštel Ečka in the neighboring village of the same name, a castle which became cultural and entertainment center of the rich nobility. Lukino Selo, on the other hand, served for the settling of the help, gardeners, farmers, etc.

The Belo lake was created by the denizens, and the formation of a lake from a marsh of the same name lasted for a century. The swamp was deepened and cleaned and soon turned into the fish pond, which was the main economic activity for the villagers. There used to be a mill on the shore of the lake. It was connected to the village via two small stone bridges.

Original settlers were poor and landless peasants. In 1825, some 200 Bulgarian Catholics were settled in the village, but they were Hungarized in time. They were brought in order to boost the vegetable production.

Characteristics 

Lukino Selo is a typical Pannonian village. It consists of three parallel streets, stretched in the northwest-southeast direction, with uneven space between them, which are connected by other three short transversal streets. Over 90% of houses still use individual water sources (water wells, etc.). There are lower grades elementary school and post office in the village.

Population 

The population has been experiencing a constant depopulation in the past 7 decades. Lukino Selo remains predominantly settled by the Hungarians. There used to be a Romani inhabited section of the village. Their settlement can be traced back to the original settling of the village, in the Lazar Lukač's lifetime, but it was abandoned and today there is a meadow where the settlement used to be.

Ethnic groups (2002 census) 

 Hungarians = 404 (67.56%)
 Serbs = 78 (13.04%)
 Yugoslavs = 27 (4.52%)
 Romani = 21 (3.51%)
 others.

Economy 

The village is predominantly agricultural. Main agricultural products are corn, wheat, sunflower and tobacco, but the old production of vegetables, namely tomatoes, still survives. For a period, vegetables were the most dominant products. They used to be transported to Belo Blato, where they were loaded onto the boats and transported further by the Bega river. Husbandry was quite developed, but it is also declining today. It includes mostly cattle.

The fishery is also important for the village's economy, especially during its history. Most of the facilities of the Ečka fish pond are located in Lukino Selo, but the fishery complex is named after the much larger village of Ečka, in the vicinity.

Still, as of 2018 the overall economy is in a very bad shape. Some of the inhabitants travel to Zrenjanin to work in the Dräxlmaier Group factory. The local community estimated that the population shrunk from 500 in 2011 to 200 in 2018 as a result of Hungarian government's policy of approving papers for all Hungarians living abroad. Many took the opportunity and migrated to the European Union.

Notable people 

 Janika Balaž, most famous Serbian tamburitza player, of Romani origin.

See also 

Carska Bara
List of places in Serbia
List of cities, towns and villages in Vojvodina

References

Sources 

 Slobodan Ćurčić, Broj stanovnika Vojvodine, Novi Sad, 1996.

External links 

History of Lukino Selo

Zrenjanin
Populated places in Serbian Banat